Sharafdzhon Solehov (born 14 December 1999) is a Tajikistani professional football player who currently plays for FK Fayzkand, on loan from FK Khujand.

Career

Club
On 15 February 2020, FK Khujand announced the signing of Solehov.

On 1 August 2020, Khujand announced that Solehov had joined FK Fayzkand on loan for the remainder of the season.

International
Solehov made his senior team debut on 13 December 2018 against Oman, scoring his first goal for Tajikistan in the same game.

Career statistics

International

Statistics accurate as of match played 19 July 2019

International goals
Scores and results list Tajikistan's goal tally first.

References

External links
 

1999 births
Living people
Tajikistani footballers
Tajikistan international footballers
Association football midfielders